Prêmio Saci (English: Saci Award), was an award presented annually by O Estado de S. Paulo, to honour the best Brazilian theater and film performers.

History

During the 1950s and 1960s, it was the biggest award in national cinema.

His statuette was the Saci, a famous figure of Brazilian folklore, suggested by a reader through a competition opened by the newspaper. The trophy was sculpted by the plastic artist Victor Brecheret.

Awarded (selection) 
Inezita Barroso (1953 and 1955)
Tônia Carrero
Walmor Chagas (1956)
Cyro Del Nero
Jorge Dória
Odete Lara (1957)
Eliane Lage (1953) for her performance in Sinhá Moça
Nydia Licia
Osvaldo Moles
Rachel de Queiroz (1954)
Mário Sérgio (1953)
Ruth de Souza
Eva Wilma

References

Brazilian film awards
Awards disestablished in the 20th century
Awards established in 1950
1950 establishments in Brazil